Carter Pann (born February 21, 1972 in La Grange, Illinois) is an American composer.  He studied composition and piano at the Eastman School of Music and the University of Michigan, Ann Arbor, where he earned a Doctor of Musical Arts degree.  His teachers include Samuel Adler, William Albright, Warren Benson, William Bolcom, David Liptak, Joseph Schwantner, and Bright Sheng, and piano with Barry Snyder.

His works have been performed by the London Symphony Orchestra, City of Birmingham Symphony, Vancouver Symphony, National Repertory Orchestra, RTÉ National Symphony Orchestra, Syracuse Symphony, New York Youth Symphony, Chicago Youth Symphony, Metropolitan Youth Symphony Orchestra,  the Haddonfield Symphony, Carolina Crown Drum and Bugle Corps, and many other college orchestras and bands, among others.  He has also received awards and recognition from the American Academy of Arts and Letters, Masterprize, the American Composers Orchestra, ASCAP, the K. Serocki Competition in Poland, the Zoltan Kodaly and Francois d'Albert Concours Internationales de Composition, and a concerto commission for clarinettist Richard Stoltzman.

Pann currently teaches composition and theory at the University of Colorado Boulder.

Selected recorded works

Antares
Dance Partita
Deux séjours
Differences for cello and piano
Factories: Locomotive/Gothic/Mercurial/At Peace, for wind ensemble
Hold This Boy and Listen
Love Letters (2000)
Piano Concerto
Slalom, for symphony orchestra
Soiree Macabre: with demons on the dance floor
Symphony for Winds "My Brother's Brain"'''The Bills, for pianoThe Cheese Grater – A Mean Two-StepThe High SongsThe Mechanics, for saxophone quartetThe Piano's 12 SidesThe Three EmbracesTwo Portraits of BarcelonaWrangler'', for wind ensemble

External links

Carter Pann's page at Theodore Presser Company

Interview with Carter Pann, July 16, 2000

1972 births
Eastman School of Music alumni
Living people
People from La Grange, Illinois
Ragtime composers
University of Colorado Boulder faculty
University of Michigan School of Music, Theatre & Dance alumni
Pupils of Samuel Adler (composer)
20th-century classical composers
21st-century classical composers
21st-century American composers
American male classical composers
American classical composers
20th-century American composers
Classical musicians from Illinois
20th-century American male musicians
21st-century American male musicians
Pupils of Joseph Schwantner